Amir Hossein Zare (born 16 January 2001) is an Iranian freestyle wrestler who currently competes in the heavyweight division. Zare became World Champion in 2021, and was the 2019 U23 World Champion at age 18. He claimed a Tokyo Olympic Games bronze medal in 2021. In the age-group, he was the 2018 Cadet World Champion and claimed silver medals from the 2019 Junior World Championships and the 2018 Youth Summer Olympics.

Early life 
Zare started Pahlevani and zoorkhaneh rituals from elementary school, then entered wrestling during middle school. He during primary school, he used to go to the ancient gym with his father and uncle.

Career

2019 
The 2018 Cadet World Champion, Zare made his senior level debut in October 2019 at the age of 18, going 4–0 at the Iranian Premier League with a notable victory over two–time and reigning Asian Continental champion Yadollah Mohebbi. He followed up with his international debut, claiming the 2019 U23 World Championship after cleaning out the bracket with technical falls. Next, he took out reigning World Champion Geno Petriashvili in the final match of the Premier League, claiming gold for the team. His first loss came at the Alans International, where he placed third with notable and dominant technical falls over the accomplished Khasanboy Rakhimov and Nick Gwiazdowski. To close out the year, he helped Iran reach the gold medal at the World Clubs Cup.

2020–2021 
In 2020, Zare only competed twice, claiming the Matteo Pellicone Ranking Series crown with notable wins over 2012 Olympic champion Bilyal Makhov and Nick Matuhin, and placing second at the Team Trials for the Individual World Cup. In 2021, Zare claimed the 2021 Poland Open by beating Nick Gwiazdowski via disqualification after the later refused to engage due to Zare's pressure. In the 2020 Summer Olympics, Zare won a Bronze Medal by defeating Deng Zhiwei in the Bronze Medal match. After 32 years, Zare won Iran's freestyle wrestling gold medal in the heavyweight division of the World Championships in Norway by defeating Geno Petriashvili. Zare, in his seniors international debut, clinched a precious bronze medal at the Tokyo Olympics.

2022 

He won one of the bronze medals in the men's 125kg event at the 2022 World Wrestling Championships held in Belgrade, Serbia. Zare faced the Canadian Amar Dhesi who has the Pan American gold and silver medals, and beat him wisely 8-0 to win the bronze medal.

Freestyle record 

! colspan="7"| International Senior Freestyle Matches
|-
!  Res.
!  Record
!  Opponent
!  Score
!  Date
!  Event
!  Location
|-
! style=background:white colspan=7 |
|-
|Win
|33–5
|align=left| Amar Dhesi
|style="font-size:88%"|8–0
|style="font-size:88%"|September 16, 2022
|style="font-size:88%" rowspan=4|2022 World Championships
|style="text-align:left;font-size:88%;" rowspan=4| Belgrade, Serbia
|-
|Loss
|32–5
|align=left| Taha Akgül
|style="font-size:88%"|2–4
|style="font-size:88%" rowspan=3|September 15, 2022
|-
|Win
|32–4
|align=left| Oleksandr Khotsianivskyi
|style="font-size:88%"|TF 10–0
|-
|Win
|32–4
|align=left| Deng Zhiwei
|style="font-size:88%"|3–0
|-
! style=background:white colspan=7 |
|-
|Win
|31–4
|align=left| Geno Petriashvili
|style="font-size:88%"|9–2
|style="font-size:88%"|October 3, 2021
|style="font-size:88%" rowspan=4|2021 World Championships
|style="text-align:left;font-size:88%;" rowspan=4| Oslo, Norway
|-
|Win
|30–4
|align=left| Taha Akgül
|style="font-size:88%"|4–0
|style="font-size:88%" rowspan=3|October 2, 2021
|-
|Win
|29–4
|align=left| Nick Gwiazdowski
|style="font-size:88%"|TF 10–0
|-
|Win
|28–4
|align=left| Dzianis Khramiankou
|style="font-size:88%"|6–0
|-
! style=background:white colspan=7 |
|-
|Win
|27–4
|align=left| Deng Zhiwei
|style="font-size:88%"|5–0
|style="font-size:88%" rowspan=4|August 5–6, 2021
|style="font-size:88%" rowspan=4|2020 Summer Olympics
|style="text-align:left;font-size:88%;" rowspan=4|
 Tokyo, Japan
|-
|Loss
|26–4
|align=left| Geno Petriashvili
|style="font-size:88%"|3–6
|-
|Win
|26–3
|align=left| Egzon Shala
|style="font-size:88%"|TF 13–2
|-
|Win
|25–3
|align=left| Oleksandr Khotsianivskyi
|style="font-size:88%"|7–0
|-
! style=background:white colspan=7 |
|-
|Win
|24–3
|align=left| Nick Gwiazdowski
|style="font-size:88%"|DQ (6–1)
|style="font-size:88%" rowspan=3|June 9, 2021
|style="font-size:88%" rowspan=3|2021 Poland Open
|style="text-align:left;font-size:88%;" rowspan=3|
 Warsaw, Poland
|-
|Win
|22–3
|align=left| Oleksandr Kalinovskyi
|style="font-size:88%"|TF 10–0
|-
|Win
|21–3
|align=left| Diaaeldin Kamal
|style="font-size:88%"|TF 10–0
|-
! style=background:white colspan=7 |
|-
|Loss
|20–3
|align=left| Amin Taheri
|style="font-size:88%"|3–4
|style="font-size:88%" rowspan=5|November 5, 2020
|style="font-size:88%" rowspan=5|2020 Iranian World Team Trials
|style="text-align:left;font-size:88%;" rowspan=5|
 Tehran, Iran
|-
|Win
|20–2
|align=left| Amin Taheri
|style="font-size:88%"|3–1
|-
|Loss
|19–2
|align=left| Amin Taheri
|style="font-size:88%"|0–2
|-
|Win
|19–1
|align=left| Parviz Hadi
|style="font-size:88%"|4–0
|-
|Win
|18–1
|align=left| Yadollah Mohebbi
|style="font-size:88%"|4–1
|-
! style=background:white colspan=7 |
|-
|Win
|17–1
|align=left| Bilyal Makhov
|style="font-size:88%"|5–3
|style="font-size:88%" rowspan=3|January 15–18, 2020
|style="font-size:88%" rowspan=3|Matteo Pellicone Ranking Series 2020
|style="text-align:left;font-size:88%;" rowspan=3|
 Rome, Italy
|-
|Win
|16–1
|align=left| Nick Matuhin
|style="font-size:88%"|8–0
|-
|Win
|15–1
|align=left| Yusup Batirmurzaev
|style="font-size:88%"|Fall
|-
! style=background:white colspan=7 |
|-
|Win
|14–1
|align=left| FF
|style="font-size:88%"|FF
|style="font-size:88%" rowspan=2|December 17–21, 2019
|style="font-size:88%" rowspan=2|2019 World Clubs Cup
|style="text-align:left;font-size:88%;" rowspan=2|
 Bojnoord, Iran
|-
|Win
|13–1
|align=left| Amir Bazrafshan
|style="font-size:88%"|10–2
|-
! style=background:white colspan=7 |
|-
|Win
|12–1
|align=left| Nick Gwiazdowski
|style="font-size:88%"|TF 10–0
|style="font-size:88%" rowspan=4|December 7–8, 2019
|style="font-size:88%" rowspan=4|2019 Alans International
|style="text-align:left;font-size:88%;" rowspan=4|
 Vladikavkaz, Russia
|-
|Loss
|11–1
|align=left| Batradz Gazzaev
|style="font-size:88%"|2–3
|-
|Win
|11–0
|align=left| Atsamaz Tebloev
|style="font-size:88%"|FF
|-
|Win
|10–0
|align=left| Khasanboy Rakhimov
|style="font-size:88%"|TF 12–2
|-
! style=background:white colspan=7 |
|-
|Win
|9–0
|align=left| Geno Petriashvili
|style="font-size:88%"|15–11
|style="font-size:88%" |November 22, 2019
|style="font-size:88%" |2019 Iranian Premier League
|style="text-align:left;font-size:88%;" |
 Tehran, Iran
|-
! style=background:white colspan=7 |
|-
|Win
|8–0
|align=left| Vitaly Goloev
|style="font-size:88%"|TF 10–0
|style="font-size:88%" rowspan=4|October 28–30, 2019
|style="font-size:88%" rowspan=4|2019 U23 World Championships
|style="text-align:left;font-size:88%;" rowspan=4|
 Budapest, Hungary
|-
|Win
|7–0
|align=left| Zuriko Urtashvili
|style="font-size:88%"|TF 11–0
|-
|Win
|6–0
|align=left| Yusup Batirmurzaev
|style="font-size:88%"|TF 17–7
|-
|Win
|5–0
|align=left| Samhan Jabrailov
|style="font-size:88%"|TF 11–0
|-
|Win
|4–0
|align=left| Soheil Yousefi
|style="font-size:88%"|
|style="font-size:88%" rowspan=4|October 6–7, 2019
|style="font-size:88%" rowspan=4|2019 Iranian Premier League
|style="text-align:left;font-size:88%;" rowspan=4|
 Tehran, Iran
|-
|Win
|3–0
|align=left| Vahid Yousefvand
|style="font-size:88%"|
|-
|Win
|2–0
|align=left| Yadollah Mohebbi
|style="font-size:88%"|
|-
|Win
|1–0
|align=left| Soheil Gholipour Safar
|style="font-size:88%"|
|-

References
 Amir Hossein Zare - The Sports

External links
 
 
 

2001 births
Living people
Iranian male sport wrestlers
Wrestlers at the 2018 Summer Youth Olympics
Wrestlers at the 2020 Summer Olympics
Olympic wrestlers of Iran
Medalists at the 2020 Summer Olympics
Olympic bronze medalists for Iran
Olympic medalists in wrestling
World Wrestling Champions
People from Amol
Sportspeople from Mazandaran province
21st-century Iranian people